The Ivaylovgrad Dam(язовир "Ивайловград") is located in the eastern Rhodope Mountains and is situated on the Arda river, Southern Bulgaria. There are another two large dams of the Arda upstream - Kardzhali Dam and Studen Kladenets Dam to the west of Ivaylovgrad Dam.

The top of the dam consists of six spillways, totaling  m in length.

Ivaylovgrad Reservoir is an attractive place for tourists and fishermen, where rudd is caught in great numbers.

Hydroelectric generation
Arda Hydro Power Cascade consist of three large hydro power sites, mainly used for electricity generation, with a total installed capacity of 331 MW and a total annual output of over 520 GWh/y. Ivaylovgrad hydroelectric power plant (HPP) is the last stage of the Arda cascade. The initial plans for the construction of a dam on the Arda date to as early as 1948. Construction began in 1959 and was completed in 1964, with the HPP starting production the same year. "Ivaylovgrad" Hydroelectric Power Plant is built-in inside the dam. The HPP has four Francis-type turbines, 26 MW each with a mean annual generation of 195 GWh/y.

External links

References

Buildings and structures in Kardzhali Province
Buildings and structures in Haskovo Province
Rhodope Mountains
Dams in Bulgaria
Hydroelectric power stations in Bulgaria
Dams completed in 1964